Vyshniye Peny is a rural locality (a selo) and the administrative center of Vyshnepenskoye Rural Settlement, Rakityansky District, Belgorod Oblast, Russia. The population was 904 as of 2010. There are 12 streets.

Geography 
Vyshniye Peny is located 24 km northeast of Rakitnoye (the district's administrative centre) by road. Vengerovka is the nearest rural locality.

References 

Rural localities in Rakityansky District